Hossain Reza Khorrami (also Khorami, born January 5, 1946) is a retired Iranian light-heavyweight freestyle wrestler who won a silver medal at the 1974 Asian Games. He placed fourth-fifth at the 1972 Summer Olympics and at the 1971 and 1973 world championships. His brother Mohammad also won a silver medal at the 1974 Asian Games, but in the 68 kg division.

References

External links
 

1946 births
Living people
Iranian male sport wrestlers
Wrestlers at the 1974 Asian Games
Asian Games silver medalists for Iran
Medalists at the 1974 Asian Games
Asian Games medalists in wrestling
Wrestlers at the 1972 Summer Olympics
Olympic wrestlers of Iran
20th-century Iranian people
21st-century Iranian people